Gurmitkal Assembly constituency is one of 224 assembly constituencies in Karnataka State, in India. It is part of Gulbarga (Lok Sabha constituency).

Assembly members

Mysore State
 1962: Vidyadhar Guruji Sayanna, Swatantra Party

 1967: N. Yenkappa, Indian National Congress

 1972: Mallikarjun Kharge, Indian National Congress

Karnataka State
 1978:	Mallikarjun Kharge, Indian National Congress (Indira)

 1983:	Mallikarjun Kharge, Indian National Congress

 1985:	Mallikarjun Kharge, Indian National Congress

 1989:	Mallikarjun Kharge, Indian National Congress

 1994:	Mallikarjun Kharge, Indian National Congress

 1999:	Mallikarjun Kharge, Indian National Congress

 2004:	Mallikarjun Kharge, Indian National Congress

 2008:	Baburao Chinchansur, Indian National Congress

 2013:	Baburao Chinchansur, Indian National Congress

 2018: Nagangouda Kandkur, Janata Dal (Secular)

See also

 Yadgir (Karnataka Assembly constituency)
 Yadgir (Lok Sabha constituency)
 List of constituencies of the Karnataka Legislative Assembly

References

Assembly constituencies of Karnataka
Yadgir district